Ubiquilin 4 is a protein in humans that is encoded by the UBQLN4 gene. Ubiquilin 4 regulates proteasomal protein degradation.

Similarity to Other Proteins

Human UBQLN4 shares a high degree of similarity with related ubiquilins including UBQLN1 and UBQLN2.

References

External links